Eupithecia laoica is a moth in the family Geometridae that is endemic to Laos.

The fore- and hindwings are dingy brown.

References

External links

laoica
Moths described in 2009
Moths of Asia
Endemic fauna of Laos